Alihan Kubalas (born 26 October 1991) is a Turkish professional footballer who plays as a midfielder for TFF Second League club Vanspor FK.

Professional career
A youth product of various Istanbul based team, Kubalas spent his early career in the lower divisions of Turkish football before moving to Ankaragücü in 2016. Kubalas made his professional debut for in an Ankaragücü in a 2–1 Süper Lig loss to Kasımpaşa on 2 September 2018.

References

External links
 
 
 

1991 births
People from Şişli
Footballers from Istanbul
Living people
Turkish footballers
Association football midfielders
Anadolu Üsküdar 1908 footballers
Sivasspor footballers
Tokatspor footballers
Altay S.K. footballers
Fatih Karagümrük S.K. footballers
İstanbulspor footballers
MKE Ankaragücü footballers
Süper Lig players
TFF First League players
TFF Second League players